Diogo Galvão de Macedo, the Diogo Galvão (born March 7, 1982) is a Brazilian football striker.

Career
In 2011 played in the Goiás.

In July 2011 he moved to Paysandu.

References

External links
 
 
 futpedia.globo

1982 births
Living people
Brazilian footballers
Goiás Esporte Clube players
Atlético Clube Goianiense players
Paysandu Sport Club players
Brasiliense Futebol Clube players
Association football forwards
União Esporte Clube players